Sawawai (صواوئ/ in Urdu, Pashto) is a small village of Buner District in KPK (Khyber Pakhtunkhwa), Pakistan with a population of about 1000 to 1500 people.

References 

Populated places in Buner District